Meagan Rose Dixon (born 23 April 1997) is an Australian cricketer who currently plays for Australian Capital Territory in the Women's National Cricket League and Adelaide Strikers in the Women's Big Bash League (WBBL). An all-rounder, she is a right-handed batter and right-arm medium bowler. She previously played for Queensland, making her debut for the side on 11 November 2018, scoring 1* and bowling seven overs for 22 runs without taking a wicket.

References

External links

1997 births
Living people
People from Mount Isa
Cricketers from Queensland
Australian women cricketers
Adelaide Strikers (WBBL) cricketers
Queensland Fire cricketers
ACT Meteors cricketers